Rajupeta is a village in Eluru district of the Indian state of Andhra Pradesh. It is located in Pedapadu mandal of Eluru revenue division. The nearest train station is Vinnamangalam (VGM) located at a distance of 20.21 Km.

Demographics 

 Census of India, Nandikeswarapuram had a population of 622. The total population constitute, 323  males and 299 females with a sex ratio of 926 females per 1000 males. 58 children are in the age group of 0–6 years with sex ratio of 611. The average literacy rate stands at 72.34%.

References 

Villages in Eluru district